Michael Rymer (born 1 March 1963 in Melbourne) is an Australian television and film director, best known for his work on the re-imagined Battlestar Galactica TV series, for which he directed the pilot miniseries and several episodes of the series. He also directed In Too Deep and Queen of the Damned.

Rymer attended film school at the University of Southern California.

Filmography
Dead Sleep (1990)
Angel Baby (1995)
Allie and Me (1997)
In Too Deep (1999)
Perfume (2001)
Queen of the Damned (2002)
Battlestar Galactica (2003)
Battlestar Galactica (2004–2009)
Revolution (2009)
Face to Face (2011)
American Horror Story: Asylum (2012)
Hannibal (2013–2015)
Deadline Gallipoli (2015)
The Man in the High Castle (2015)
Jessica Jones (2015)
Picnic at Hanging Rock (2018) (2 episodes)

Awards
Rymer won the award of Best Dramatic Feature at the 2012 Byron Bay International Film Festival for the film Face to Face.

External links
 

1963 births
Living people
Australian film directors
American television directors
Horror film directors
Hugo Award winners